Below is a list of events in chess in 1993, as well as the top ten FIDE rated chess players of that year.

Top players

FIDE top 10 by Elo rating - January 1993

 Garry Kasparov  2805
 Anatoly Karpov  2725
 Vassily Ivanchuk  2710
 Viswanathan Anand  2710
 Boris Gelfand  2690
 Vladimir Kramnik  2685
 Alexei Shirov  2670
 Evgeny Bareev  2670
 Kiril Georgiev  2660
 Valery Salov  2660

Tournaments 
List of strong chess tournaments in 1993.

Chess news in brief

Nigel Short defeats Jan Timman 7½-5½ at the San Lorenzo de El Escorial Candidates Final and emerges as Garry Kasparov's challenger for the World Chess Championship. Kasparov and Short controversially distance themselves from FIDE, setting up the Professional Chess Association (PCA) and announcing that their world championship match will be held in London under the auspices of the new organising body. FIDE denounces their actions and forfeits both players from its own world championship cycle, in the process stripping Kasparov of his FIDE world title. Kasparov wins the PCA world championship match against Short by a comfortable 12½-7½ margin.
FIDE remove Kasparov and Short from its rating list and arrange a rival world championship match between Anatoly Karpov and Jan Timman, both of whom had been defeated by Short in the run up to the PCA final. Karpov wins the contest 12½-8½.
Xie Jun successfully defends her Women's World Champion title against Nana Ioseliani in Monaco by the runaway score of 8½-2½.
Kasparov wins a very strong Linares tournament with 10/13 from Karpov and Viswanathan Anand (both 8½/13); 11 of the world's top 14 players are in attendance.
Karpov wins at Dortmund with 5½/7, ahead of Vladimir Kramnik and Christopher Lutz (both 4/7).
Alexei Shirov wins at Munich with 8/11 (from Boris Gelfand on 7½/11).
Alexander Beliavsky (7½/9) wins at Belgrade, ahead of Vladimir Kramnik (6/9).
Ivan Morovic is victorious in Las Palmas with 6/9, edging out Anand and Alexander Khalifman (both 5½/9).
Karpov wins the knockout tournament at Tilburg, defeating Vasily Ivanchuk in the final.
FIDE's Interzonal is held at Biel, Switzerland. Boris Gelfand excels to win with 9/13, in front of a large group on 8½/13. Michael Adams, Gata Kamsky, Alexander Khalifman, Vladimir Kramnik, Joël Lautier, Valery Salov, Paul van der Sterren, Leonid Yudasin and Viswanathan Anand all qualify for the next stage.
The PCA Qualifier (equivalent to FIDE's Interzonal) is held in Groningen, Netherlands. It is won by Michael Adams and Viswanathan Anand. The other qualifiers for the Candidates Matches are Vladimir Kramnik, Gata Kamsky, Sergei Tiviakov, Boris Gulko and Oleg Romanishin.
The Women's Interzonal, held in Jakarta is won by Ketevan Arakhamia.
The World Junior Chess Championship is won by Igor Miladinović of Serbia.
Alexander Shabalov and Alex Yermolinsky both enjoy success in Philadelphia, winning the US Open and World Open, respectively. The two tie for the US Chess Championship held at Long Beach.
The US Women's Chess Championship, held in Illinois is shared by Elena Donaldson and Irina Levitina.
Judit Polgár and Evgeny Bareev share victory at the 1992/93 Hastings International Chess Congress.
Gata Kamsky wins the U.S. National Open in Las Vegas.
Mark Taimanov wins the World Senior Chess Championship in Bad Wildbad, Germany.
Boris Spassky and Judit Polgár play a match in Budapest. Polgar wins.
At the Harvard Cup, held in Boston, the humans beat the computers by a convincing score of 27-9. Joel Benjamin's winning tally is a perfect 6-0.
In Bosnia and Herzegovina, a chess player is shot and killed by a sniper while playing a game.
A movie titled Searching for Bobby Fischer in the US and Innocent Moves in the UK is released by Paramount. Based on the life of Joshua Waitzkin, it stars Max Pomeranc in the lead role. Oscar-winning actor Ben Kingsley plays the part of trainer Bruce Pandolfini.

Births

Parimarjan Negi, Indian prodigy, a GM and youngest ever IM - February 9
Wesley So, Filipino prodigy, a GM at little over 14 years - October 9

Deaths

Reuben Fine, a leading player of the 1930s and 1940s, former US Champion and noted writer - March 26.
Vladimir Makogonov, Soviet IM and honorary GM, a leading player of the 1940s - January 2
Boris Kogan, Russian-American IM and former Soviet Junior Champion - December 25.
Alexander Koblencs, Latvian IM, trainer and writer - December 9
Johannes Turn, a leading Estonian master of the 1920s, 1930s and 1940s - March 8

References

Chess History & Chronology - Bill Wall(  2009-10-20)
Olimpbase - Olympiads and other Team event information
FIDE rating list data 1970-97
Danny Kopec account of 4th Harvard Cup

 
20th century in chess
Chess by year